La Horse is a 1970 French-language thriller directed by Pierre Granier-Deferre and based on Michel Lambesc's novel of the same name.

Plot 
In Normandy, the widower Auguste Maroilleur rules his family and his farm with an iron hand. Bien Phu, a disabled veteran of the war in Indochina, is a valued employee. Out shooting duck, Auguste and Bien Phu discover a huge cache of heroin. Auguste deduces that his grandson Henri, whose vacation job is on a ship, must be a courier. He destroys the drug, worth millions, and confines Henri to a cellar. When the gangsters cannot find their man or their merchandise, they try to destroy Auguste's livelihood and peace of mind. They burn a barn, brutally kill his cattle and rape his virgin granddaughter. He and Bien Phu fight back, eventually killing all five villains by shotgun and grenade. This private war does not go unnoticed and the police bring the whole family in for questioning. Following Auguste's orders, none of them give a thing away and all are released.

Reception
Though massacred by French critics, the film was loved by the French public. As well as the magisterial presence of Jean Gabin, it carried echoes of the unsolved Dominici affair of 1952 and the 1943 film Goupi Mains Rouges.

Cast 
 Jean Gabin as Auguste Maroilleur, farm owner
 Marc Porel as Henri, Auguste's grandson
 Danièle Ajoret as Louise, younger daughter of Auguste 
 Michel Barbey as Maurice, husband of Louise 
 Christian Barbier as Léon, husband of Mathilde
 Pierre Dux as the investigating magistrate
 Armando Francioli as Francis Grutti, a gangster
 Julien Guiomar as the police inspector 
 Eléonore Hirt as Mathilde, elder daughter of Auguste
 Reinhard Kolldehoff as Hans, a drug baron
 Astrid Frank as girlfriend of Hans
 Félix Marten as Marc, a gangster 
 Orlane Paquin as Véronique, granddaughter of Auguste
 André Weber as Bien-Phu, farm worker
 Henri Attal as Louis, a gangster
 Dominique Zardi as Tony, a gangster
 Albert Delpy

Awards

References

External links

1970 films
1970s crime drama films
French crime drama films
Italian crime drama films
West German films
Films directed by Pierre Granier-Deferre
Films based on crime novels
Films based on French novels
Films set in France
Films about families
Films scored by Serge Gainsbourg
1970 drama films
1970s French-language films
1970s French films
1970s Italian films